Villa de Mayo is a town in the Malvinas Argentinas Partido of Buenos Aires Province, Argentina. It is located in the north west of Greater Buenos Aires urban conurbation around 39 km from Buenos Aires.

External links

 Municipal website map

Populated places in Buenos Aires Province
Malvinas Argentinas Partido